The Khost rebellion was an anti-taxation revolt that began in early 1856 in the Emirate of Afghanistan. After encountering minor resistance in February 1856, the rebelling Khostwal and Waziri tribesmen besieged the Khost Fort in March. Despite failed peace negotiations in July and August, the rebellion did not end until early 1857.

References 

1856 in Afghanistan
Conflicts in 1856
1857 in Afghanistan
Conflicts in 1857
History of Khost Province
Military history of Afghanistan
Rebellions in Afghanistan